League Club is a term used to refer to football (soccer) clubs that are in one of the top professional leagues of a country. The club itself does not have to be professional and in some of the lower leagues of more minor footballing nations some clubs have become semi-professional in order to compete. The oldest league club in the world is Notts County.

Not be confused with Leagues Clubs, an Australian phenomenon where hospitality and gaming venues fund National Rugby League teams.

League status by country

References 

Association football terminology